Basimah Aziz Nasir is a member of the Islamic Supreme Council of Iraq and currently a member of the Iraqi Council.

References

Members of the Council of Representatives of Iraq
Living people
Islamic Supreme Council of Iraq politicians
Year of birth missing (living people)
Place of birth missing (living people)